Shafquat Jung was an Indian politician and a member of the 4th Legislative Assembly of Uttar Pradesh of India. He represents the Kairana constituency of Uttar Pradesh and was a member of the Congress political party.

Positions held
 Chairman Municipal Board, Kandhla, 
 Chairman District Board, Muzaffar Nagar, and 
 MLA U.P. Vidhan Sabha, 1967

Elections Contested

References

 http://164.100.47.194/loksabha/writereaddata/biodata_1_12/2239.htm
 S No 379
 Page No. 193/234
 https://deobandlive.com/shafquat-jang/

Indian National Congress politicians from Uttar Pradesh
People from Muzaffarnagar district
India MPs 1971–1977
Lok Sabha members from Uttar Pradesh
Possibly living people
Uttar Pradesh MLAs 1967–1969